Honor America Day was a rally put together by supporters of President Richard Nixon in 1970 to counter national outrage over the Cambodian invasion and the Kent State University killings. Co-chaired by Bob Hope, the rally took place in Washington, DC on July 4, 1970.

Billy Graham gave the keynote address:

Some people saw it as a political pro war rally and protested by jumping in the pool and chanting antiwar slogans.

A live album of the event, titled Proudly They Came...to Honor America was later released.

See also 
 Salute to America, a similar Independence Day rally and event organized by Donald Trump in 2019.

References

External links 
 Hope for America: Performers, Politics and Pop Culture - Controversy and Confusion, Library of Congress exhibit
 Film report on Honor America Day by the U.S. Information Agency
 

1970 protests
1970 in American politics
1970 in Washington, D.C.
July 1970 events in the United States
Presidency of Richard Nixon